The following table indicates the party of elected officials in the United States insular area of the Northern Mariana Islands:
Governor
Lieutenant Governor
Attorney General (first elected in 2014).
Resident Representative in Washington, D.C. (through 2008); non-voting delegate to the United States House of Representatives (beginning 2009)

The table also indicates the historical party composition in the:
Territorial Senate
Territorial House of Representatives

Notes

References

See also
Politics of the Northern Mariana Islands
Elections in the Northern Mariana Islands
List of political parties in the Northern Mariana Islands

Politics of the Northern Mariana Islands
Government of the Northern Mariana Islands